The Partnership for New York City, formerly called the New York City Partnership, is a nonprofit membership organization consisting of a select group of nearly three hundred CEOs ("Partners") from New York City's top corporate, investment and entrepreneurial firms. The organization was founded by David Rockefeller in 1979, with the aim of working closely with government, labor and the nonprofit sector to enhance the economy and maintain New York City's position as the global center of commerce, culture and innovation. It merged with the New York Chamber of Commerce and Industry in 2002, forming the current organization.

The Partnership focuses on research, policy formulation and issue advocacy at the city, state and federal levels. Through its affiliate, the Partnership Fund for New York City, the Partnership directly invests in economic development projects in all five boroughs of the city. To date, the Fund has raised in excess of $110 million and made more than 100 investments in businesses and nonprofit projects that promote the local economy.

In 2014, the Partnership was named by Crain's New York Business as New York City's most-connected nonprofit.  The current President of the Partnership is Kathryn Wylde.

Brad Hoylman, now a New York State Senator, formerly served as the Partnership's general counsel.

See also
 Greater New York Chamber Of Commerce

References

External links
 
 C-SPAN Q&A interview with Partnership President & CEO Kathryn Wylde

Economy of New York City
1979 establishments in New York City
Chamber of Commerce of the State of New York